The 2002 African Women's Championship qualification process was organized by the Confederation of African Football (CAF) to decide the participating teams of the 2002 African Women's Championship. Nigeria qualified automatically as both hosts and defending champions, while the remaining seven spots were determined by the qualifying rounds, which took place from August to October 2002.

Teams
A record 21 national teams participated in the qualifying process.

Teams who withdrew are in italics.

Format
Qualification ties were played on a home-and-away two-legged basis. If the aggregate score was tied after the second leg, the away goals rule would be applied, and if still level, the penalty shoot-out would be used to determine the winner (no extra time would be played).

The seven winners of the final round qualified for the final tournament.

Schedule
The schedule of the qualifying rounds was as follows.

First round

|}
1 Botswana, Guinea-Bissau and Swaziland withdrew.

Zambia won by default and advanced to the second round.

Ethiopia won by default and advanced to the second round.

Tanzania won 5–4 on aggregate and advanced to the second round.

Angola won 6–1 on aggregate and advanced to the second round.

Gabon won 8–0 on aggregate and advanced to the second round.

Senegal won by default and advanced to the second round.

4–4 on aggregate. Mali won on the away goals rule and advanced to the second round.

Second round

|}

South Africa won 8–1 on aggregate and qualified for the final tournament.

Ethiopia won 4–2 on aggregate and qualified for the final tournament.

Zimbabwe won 10–0 on aggregate and qualified for the final tournament.

1–1 on aggregate. Angola won the penalty shoot-out 5–4 and qualified for the final tournament.

Cameroon won 4–0 on aggregate and qualified for the final tournament.

Ghana won 6–1 on aggregate and qualified for the final tournament.

0–0 on aggregate. Mali won the penalty shoot-out 5–4 and qualified for the final tournament.

Goalscorers
Angolan Jacinta Ramos, Gabonese Géraldine Okawe, South African Joanne Solomon and Zimbabwean Nomsa Moyo were the top scorers in the qualifying process. In total, 70 goals were scored by 44 different players.
4 goals

 Jacinta Ramos
 Géraldine Okawe
 Joanne Solomon
 Nomsa Moyo

3 goals

 Rachel Bancouly
 Esther Zulu

2 goals

 Nadine Mvunbio
 Awasso Endegene-Leme
 Ornella Etoua
 Basilea Amoah-Tetteh
 Joyce Ohenewaa
 Maïchata Konaté
 Diaty N'Diaye
 Veronica Phewa
 Ester Chambruma
 Precious Mpala

1 goal

 Sonia de Souza
 Antoinette Anounga
 Rolande Belemgoto
 Cecile Mekongo
 Etebe Mvie Manga
 Louyeye Binga
 Genoveva Añonman
 Semhar Bereket-ab
 Teamu Debessay
 Makda Mebrahtu
 Merhawit Tekeste
 Feleke Adois
 Tesfaye Teramah
 Winie Mapangou
 Gladys Nisame
 Memuna Darku
 Sheila Okah
 Adélaïde Koudougnon
 Absah Gueye
 Nandipha Mlomo
 Mapule Nteso
 Mwaka Kavena
 Ally Mosi
 Sweet Paul
 Oliver Mbekeka
 Annet Nankimbugwe
 Christabel Muchindu
 Pretty Phiri

Qualified teams

The following teams qualified for the final tournament.

1 Bold indicates champions for that year. Italic indicates hosts for that year.

References

CAF
2003 FIFA Women's World Cup qualification
Women
2002